The Quebec Aerospace Museum (French: Musée de l’aérospatiale du Québec) is an aviation museum, located in hangar H-18 at the Montreal Saint-Hubert Longueuil Airport in Saint-Hubert, Quebec, Canada, a borough in the city of Longueuil. Founded on 23 August 2018 as a not-for-profit society, the museum currently has one aircraft.

History
The museum was founded by Pierre Gillard, Gilbert McCauley and Éric Tremblay, with Gillard assuming the role of Director General.

Aircraft
List of aircraft displayed:
Avro Canada CF-100 Canuck Mk 5 - on loan from the Canadian War Museum starting 2 November 2018, for four years, but may be permanently retained after that. The QAM staff will complete a restoration of the aircraft.

See also
Organization of Military Museums of Canada
List of aerospace museums
Military history of Canada

References

External links 

Founders photograph

Aviation history of Canada
Aerospace museums in Quebec
Museums in Quebec
Longueuil
Museums established in 2018
2018 establishments in Quebec